The 1977 Pacific Coast Athletic Association men's basketball tournament (now known as the Big West Conference men's basketball tournament) was held March 2–6 at the Anaheim Convention Center in Anaheim, California.

 defeated  in the championship game, 76–63, to win their first PCAA/Big West men's basketball tournament. 

The 49ers, in turn, received a bid to the 1977 NCAA tournament, where they lost to Idaho State in the first round.

Format
The tournament field expanded from four to seven teams.  Long Beach State, by virtue of tying with San Diego State for the regular season title but winning the tie breaker by sweeping them, received a first round bye while the other six teams were seeded for the first round based on regular season conference records.  The 2nd through 4th seeds hosted the 5th through 7th seeds on their home courts.  The three winners of those games and Long Beach State moved on to the semifinal round at the Anaheim Convention Center.

Bracket

References

Big West Conference men's basketball tournament
Tournament
Pacific Coast Athletic Association men's basketball tournament
Pacific Coast Athletic Association men's basketball tournament